Doucette is a French language surname and a variant of Doucet. Notable people with the name include:

 Allan Doucette (1872–1901), American footballer
 Bernard Doucette (died 1974), Franco-American meteorologist
 Chad Doucette (born 1988), Canadian singer
 Don Doucette (born 1952), American college basketball coach
 Eddie Doucette, American sportscaster
 Fred Doucette, American politician from New Hampshire
 Jeff Doucette (born 1947), American actor
 Jerry Doucette (1952–2022), Canadian guitarist, who released music as "Doucette"
 John Doucette (1921–1994), American actor
 John Doucett or Doucette (died 1726), Lieutenant Governor of Nova Scotia
 John W. Doucette, officer in the United States Air Force
 Paul Doucette (born 1972), American drummer
 Ryan Doucette (born 1983), Canadian actor
 Sarah Doucette, Canadian politician

See also 
 Doucette, Texas
 Doucet, surname
 Doucett, surname

French-language surnames